The women's singles table tennis event was part of the table tennis programme and took place between 29 and 31 May, at the Waseda University Gymnasium.

Schedule
All times are Japan Standard Time (UTC+09:00)

Results

Final

Top half

Bottom half

References

 Official Report

External links
ITTF Database

Table tennis at the 1958 Asian Games